Philippe Poirrier, born in 1963, is a French historian, specialist in French contemporary cultural history.

Biography 
Professor at the University of Burgundy and fellow member of the Centre Georges-Chevrier, attached to the Centre national de la recherche scientifique), he is responsible for the electronic letter of the Association pour le développement de l'histoire culturelle. His nowadays researches focus on history related to cultural policies and cultural history.

Main publications (in French)

Gothiques. Le Moyen-Age bourguignon et ses relectures modernes et contemporaines, avec Laurent Baridon, Dijon-Paris, Éditions Universitaires de Dijon/Histoire au Présent, 1992.[Sources, travaux historiques, 1991, n° 27].
Vies et légendes de Saint Bernard : création, diffusion, réception. Actes des rencontres de Dijon. 6 et 7 juin 1991, avec Jacques Berlioz et Patrick Arabeyre, Cîteaux, Cîteaux, commentarii cistercienses, 1993.
 Société et culture en France depuis 1945, Le Seuil, Paris, 1998.
 Où en est l'histoire du temps présent ? - N° 5 (hors série) de Territoires contemporains, Dijon, Eud, 1998. avec Serge Wolikow
 L'État et la Culture en France au XXe siècle, Librairie générale française (Le Livre de Poche), Paris, 2000. Troisième édition actualisée en 2009.
 Aborder l'histoire, Le Seuil, Paris, 2000
 Lucien Hérard. Du syndicaliste enseignant au médiateur culturel. L'engagement à l'échelle d'une vie, Chenôve, Les cahiers d'Adiamos, 2000
 Les Collectivités locales et la Culture. Les formes de l'institutionnalisation (XIXe–XXe siècles), avec Vincent Dubois, La Documentation française, Paris, 2002
 Les Politiques culturelles en France, La Documentation française, Paris, 2002
 Pour une histoire des politiques du patrimoine, avec Loïc Vadelorge, La Documentation française et Comité d'histoire du Ministère de la Culture, Paris, 2003
 L'Invention du patrimoine en Bourgogne, Éditions universitaires de Dijon, Dijon, 2004
 Les Enjeux de l’histoire culturelle, Le Seuil ("Points Histoire"), Paris, 2004
 La Politique culturelle en débat. Anthologie, 1955–2005, avec Geneviève Gentil, La Documentation française, Paris, 2006
Le temps des sciences humaines. Gaston Roupnel et les années trente, avec Annie Bleton-Ruget, Paris, Éditions Le Manuscrit, 2006
Art et pouvoir de 1848 à nos jours, Paris, Cndp, 2006
 Politique culturelle et patrimoines, Culture & Musées, janvier-juin 2007, n°9.
L’Histoire culturelle : un «tournant mondial» dans l’historiographie ?, Éditions universitaires de Dijon, Dijon, 2008.
Introduction à l'historiographie, Paris, Belin, 2009.
Paysages des campus. Urbanisme, architecture et patrimoine, Dijon, Éditions universitaires de Dijon, 2009.
Une ambition partagée ? La coopération entre le ministère de la culture et les collectivités territoriales (1959-2009), avec René Rizzardo, Paris, La Documentation française-Comité d'histoire du ministère de la Culture, 2009.
Politiques et pratiques de la culture, Paris, La Documentation française, 2010.
La storia culturale, avec Alessandro Arcangeli, Verona, QuiEdit, 2010.
Pour une histoire des politiques culturelles dans le monde, 1945-2011,  Paris, La Documentation française, 2011.
Festivals et sociétés en Europe, XIXe-XXIe siècle, Dijon, Territoires contemporains, 2012.

'''On-line articles:

On Cultura Historica 
On Halshs  
On ConnectCP

References 
http://www.connectcp.org/profiles/profile.php?profileid=877&lang=en

20th-century French historians
Living people
French male non-fiction writers
1963 births
21st-century French historians
Academic staff of the University of Burgundy